Rough Justice may refer to:

 Vigilante

Books
Rough Justice, novel in the Rosato & Associates series
 Rough Justice (novel), a 2008 novel by Jack Higgins

Film and TV
 Rough Justice (film), a 1970 film starring Klaus Kinski
 Rough Justice (Belgian TV series), a 2016 Belgian television series shown on Walter Presents in both the UK and US
 Rough Justice (UK TV programme), a 1982–2007 British television programme which investigated alleged miscarriages of justice that was broadcast on BBC
 Rough Justice (Porridge), an episode of the BBC sitcom Porridge

Music
 "Rough Justice" (Bananarama song), 1984
 "Rough Justice" (Rolling Stones song), 2005